The 2009–10 Miami RedHawks basketball team will represent Miami University in the college basketball season of 2009–10. The team is coached by Charlie Coles and will play their homes game in Millett Hall.

Before the season

Roster changes
The RedHawks lost two starters from last season, however they were able to keep one when forward Kenny Hayes was able to earn a Medical Redshirt and return to the team in 2009–10.  The two players that Miami lost were 2009 MAC Basketball Player of the Year Michael Bramos and Tyler Dierkers, who earned the team a combined 28.1 points per game.  They will be replaced by four new recruits one being Allen Roberts who Led Middletown "Middies" Ohio to a 19-3 record in 2008-09 and ended the regular season as the No. 3-ranked in the State (Rivals)

Recruiting

Roster
Roster current as of September 15, when their summer prospectus was published.

Coaching staff

Schedule

|-
!colspan=9 style=| MAC tournament

Sources:

References

Miami RedHawks men's basketball seasons
Miami RedHawks